Robert A. Rosenstone is an American author, historian, and Professor Emeritus of history at the California Institute of Technology. He is the leading international scholar in the fast growing field devoted to studying the relationship between history and the visual media. He has written two books on the topic, "Visions of the Past: the Challenge of Film to Our Idea of History" (Harvard, 1995), and "History on Film / Film on History" (Pearson, 2006, 2nd edition 2012), and has edited an influential collections of essays, "Revisioning History: Film and the Construction of a New Past" (Princeton, 1995).  His most recent addition to the field (coedited with young Film Studies scholar, Constantin Parvulescu), "A Blackwell Companion to Historical Film." (Wiley-Blackwell, 2013) consists of 25 original essays by scholars from six continents which assess the state of the field worldwide today.

Life
Rosenstone was born in Montreal, Quebec, the son of Jewish immigrants.  He lived most of his life in Los Angeles, California.  He received a Ph.D degree in history from the University of California, Los Angeles in 1966.  He was assistant professor at the University of Oregon from 1965 to 1966.  He was a professor of history at the Caltech from 1966 and is now professor emeritus. He currently resides in Los Angeles.

Rosenstone has been a visiting professor at Oxford University, the University of Manchester, St. Andrews University, the University of Barcelona, the European University Institute (Florence), Kyushu University (Japan), the University of La Laguna (Canary Islands), and Tolima University (Colombia).

Writings and Career

In his early career, Rosenstone worked on topics of social and political radicalism.  This resulted in two books, "Crusade of the Left: The Lincoln Battalion in the Spanish Civil War" (Pegasus, 1969, republished Transaction 2009), and "Romantic Revolutionary: A Biography of John Reed" (Knopf, 1975; republished Harvard, 1989).

Afterwards, Rosenstone has also focused on the topic of how to write about the past, particularly emphasizing and encouraging new and innovative forms of historical narrative.  His book "Mirror in the Shrine: American Encounters with Meiji Japan" (Harvard, 1988) was an experimental, multi-voiced piece of history which has been analyzed and praised by such historical theorists as Hayden White, Alun Munslow, Beverley Southgate, and Paul Ankersmit.  As a way of encouraging such innovation, Rosenstone helped to found the journal "Rethinking History: The Journal of Theory and Practice" in 1997, the only historical journal open to non-traditional and experimental forms of historical presentation.

Also, in 1989, he was asked to create a film section for The American Historical Review, the oldest history journal in the United States.  He has served as on the editorial board of several journals, including Film Historia (Barcelona), Frames (St. Andrews University); California Quarterly; and Reviews in American History.

He is also the author of several works of fiction that involve historical characters and events, including a book of stories titled "The Man Who Swam into History: The (Mostly) True Story of my Jewish Family" (Texas, 2002), and a historical novel based on the life of Russian writer Isaac Babel, "King of Odessa" (Northwestern, 2003).  His most recent novel is set in contemporary Spain, "Red Star, Crescent Moon: A Muslim - Jewish Love Story" (2008).

Film work

Rosenstone has also worked on several films, both dramatic features and documentaries.  His award-winning biography of John Reed, "Romantic Revolutionary", (Knopf, 1975) was used as the basis for the Academy Award-winning Reds, on which he worked as historical consultant for seven years.  His other involvements in film production include his writing of the narration for a documentary on the Spanish Civil War entitled "The Good Fight" (1983), appearing on screen as a "Talking Head" in several documentaries, and spending time as historical consultant and script adviser on a number other dramatic historical films.

Awards and recognition

Rosenstone has been awarded four scholarships by the National Endowment for the Humanities, three from the Fulbright program, and has been a research fellow at both the East-West Center (Honolulu) from 1981 to 1982 and the Getty Research Institute from 2004 to 2005.  His books and essays have been translated into 11 languages, including French, Spanish, Italian, Portuguese, Czech, Polish, German, Hungarian, Korean, Japanese, and Hebrew.  He has lectured at more than 50 universities on six continents.

Books--'"Crusade of the Left: The Lincoln Battalion and the Spanish Civil War", NY: Pegasus, 1969.
"Romantic Revolutionary: A Biography of John Reed", New York: Alfred Knopf, Inc., 1975; Paperback Editions - Vintage, 1981; Cambridge: Harvard, 1992. Award: Silver Medal, Commonwealth Club of California, 1975 Translations: Spanish, French, Italian, Hungarian, Korean 
"Mirror in the Shrine: American Encounters in Meiji Japan",  Cambridge: Harvard, 1988. History Book Club Selection, 1988.	Paperback edition: Harvard University Press, Translations: Japanese, Italian. 
"Revisioning History: Filmmakers and the Construction of the Past", co-editor. Princeton, N.J.: Princeton University Press, 1995. Translation: Korean
"Visions of the Past: The Challenge of Film to Our Idea of History",  Cambridge: Harvard University Press, 1995. Award: 1995 Book of the Year, Film Historia (Barcelona).	Translation: Spanish
"King of Odessa", Evanston, IL: Northwestern University Press, 2003. Award: Barnes and Noble “Great New Writer” 
"Experiments in Rethinking History", co-editor. London: Routledge, 2004.
"History on Film / Film on History", London: Longman Pearson, 2006.  2nd edition, 2013. Translations:  Spanish, Portuguese
"A Blackwell Companion to Historical Film",  Oxford: Wiley-Blackwell, 2013.
"Cine y visualidad", Santiago, Chile: University of Finis Terrae, 2013.
Adventures of a Postmodern Historian:  London, New York: Bloomsbury, 2016

Important Essays:
Rosenstone, Robert. "History in images/History in words: Reflections on the possibility of really putting history onto film". The American Historical Review, Vol. 93, No. 5. (Dec., 1988), pp. 1173–1185. Available online through JSTOR.

References
White, Hayden. "Historiography and Historiophoty". The American Historical Review'', Vol. 93, No. 5. (Dec., 1988), pp. 1193–1199. Available online through JSTOR.

External links 
 Faculty Page at Caltech
 Rosenstone Personal Webpage Bio section

Interview with Rosenstone by Tamara Maatouk, published by the Journal of the History of Ideas Blog: https://jhiblog.org/2022/10/05/history-film-another-form-of-doing-history-an-interview-with-robert-rosenstone/

20th-century American historians
American male non-fiction writers
21st-century American historians
21st-century American male writers
Living people
Anglophone Quebec people
Writers from Montreal
University of California, Los Angeles alumni
California Institute of Technology faculty
Year of birth missing (living people)
20th-century American male writers